The 1969 1. divisjon was the 25th completed season of top division football in Norway.

Overview
It was contested by 10 teams, and Rosenborg BK won the championship, their second league title.

Teams and locations
''Note: Table lists in alphabetical order.

League table

Results

Season statistics

Top scorer
 Odd Iversen, Rosenborg – 26 goals

Attendances

References
Norway - List of final tables (RSSSF)
Norsk internasjonal fotballstatistikk (NIFS)

Eliteserien seasons
Norway
Norway
1